Farmersburg is a town in Curry Township, Sullivan County, Indiana, United States. The population was 1,118 at the 2010 census. It is part of the Terre Haute Metropolitan Statistical Area. The town is adjacent to the Vigo County line and is overshadowed by several large TV and radio transmitter towers.

History
Farmersburg was founded in 1853 under the name Ascension. A post office was established under this name in 1855, and was renamed to Farmersburg in 1882. The post office is still currently operating.

Government
The Town of Farmersburg lies within Sullivan County, Indiana. Farmersburg is governed by an elected four-member Town Council and Clerk-Treasurer. The Town Council President acts as the "de facto" mayor of the town. Law enforcement in Farmersburg is the priority of the Farmersburg Town Marshal's Office, consisting of the Marshal and his\her deputies. The Marshal is also responsible for all animal and code enforcement. The Marshal is assisted by the Sullivan County Sheriff's Office.

Geography
Farmersburg is located at  (39.253321, -87.381489).

Climate
The climate in this area is characterized by hot, humid summers and generally mild to cool winters.  According to the Köppen Climate Classification system, Farmersburg has a humid subtropical climate, abbreviated "Cfa" on climate maps.

Demographics

2010 census
As of the census of 2010, there were 1,118 people, 466 households, and 306 families living in the town. The racial makeup of the town was 97.9% White, 0.6% African American, 0.4% Native American, 0.3% Asian, 0.1% from other races, and 0.7% from two or more races. Hispanic or Latino of any race were 1.3% of the population.

There were 466 households, of which 32.6% had children under the age of 18 living with them, 44.2% were married couples living together, 14.8% had a female householder with no husband present, 6.7% had a male householder with no wife present, and 34.3% were non-families. 30.0% of all households were made up of individuals, and 10.7% had someone living alone who was 65 years of age or older. The average household size was 2.40 and the average family size was 2.98.

The median age in the town was 38.7 years. 25.1% of residents were under the age of 18; 7.9% were between the ages of 18 and 24; 24.8% were from 25 to 44; 26.6% were from 45 to 64; and 15.7% were 65 years of age or older. The gender makeup of the town was 48.0% male and 52.0% female.

2000 census
As of the census of 2000, there were 1,180 people, 479 households, and 340 families living in the town. The racial makeup of the town was 97.54% White, 0.08% African American, 0.68% Native American, 0.34% Asian, and 1.36% from two or more races. Hispanic or Latino of any race were 0.59% of the population.

There were 479 households, out of which 33.8% had children under the age of 18 living with them, 53.7% were married couples living together, 11.1% had a female householder with no husband present, and 29.0% were non-families. 26.7% of all households were made up of individuals, and 12.5% had someone living alone who was 65 years of age or older. The average household size was 2.44 and the average family size was 2.89.

In the town, the population was spread out, with 26.0% under the age of 18, 7.8% from 18 to 24, 27.5% from 25 to 44, 21.9% from 45 to 64, and 16.8% who were 65 years of age or older. The median age was 37 years. For every 100 females, there were 94.7 males. For every 100 females age 18 and over, there were 84.2 males.

The median income for a household in the town was $30,478, and the median income for a family was $33,854. Males had a median income of $31,719 versus $20,100 for females. The per capita income for the town was $14,873. About 10.3% of families and 11.0% of the population were below the poverty line, including 14.2% of those under age 18 and 8.4% of those age 65 or over.

Education
Farmersburg has a public library, a branch of the Sullivan County Public Library.

References

External links
 Farmersburg Festival Inc.

Towns in Sullivan County, Indiana
Towns in Indiana
Terre Haute metropolitan area